Samuel McGowan may refer to:
 Samuel McGowan (admiral)
 Samuel McGowan (general)
 Samuel McGowan (engineer)
 S. H. McGowan (Samuel Henry McGowan), gold mining entrepreneur in Bendigo, Victoria, Australia

See also
 Samuel Magowan, member of the Parliament of Northern Ireland